Charles Frederick Shirey (January 12, 1916 - November 1, 1961) was a professional American football player for the Cleveland Rams and the Green Bay Packers. He was drafted by the Philadelphia Eagles 32nd overall in the 1938 NFL Draft. He attended Washington & Jefferson College and University of Nebraska. He was a native of Latrobe, Pennsylvania.

Notes
 

1916 births
1961 deaths
American football tackles
People from Latrobe, Pennsylvania
Cleveland Rams players
Green Bay Packers players
Players of American football from Pennsylvania
Sportspeople from the Pittsburgh metropolitan area
Washington & Jefferson College alumni
Washington & Jefferson Presidents football players
Nebraska Cornhuskers football players